Mother Superior Agnes Mariam de la Croix (born 1952), also known as Mother Agnes, is a Lebanese Christian nun. She is mother superior of the monastery of St James the Mutilated in Syria, a Melkite Greek Catholic monastery in the town of Qara in the Homs diocese. She is outspoken in regard to the Syrian Civil War and, according to Foreign Policy is "one of the most prolific defenders of the" government of Bashar al-Assad.

Early life
Born Marie Fadia Laham in Beirut, Lebanon, her Palestinian father had fled Nazareth at the time Israel was created in 1948 while her mother was Lebanese. After her education by French nuns, she became a hippie for 2 and a half years while travelling in Europe, India and Nepal. While travelling she felt called by God. She then became a nun in the Carmelite order in 1971, and worked to help displaced families from the Lebanon civil war.

De la Croix gained the consent of the religious authorities to work with the Melkite Greek Catholic Church in 1992, and moved to Syria about two years later with the objective of restoring a monastery. Mother Agnes said at an event in San Francisco during her American tour in 2013: "I used to hate Syrians who came to Lebanon to bomb us every day" during the country's civil war, but "then the Lord called me to Syria to a blessed adventure to restore an ancient monastery that was in ruins" and she underwent a "conversion" after which she "learned never to hate anyone".

Syrian Civil War
De la Croix has been accused by multiple sources of sharing Syrian regime propaganda.

After French journalist Gilles Jacquier was killed in Homs during 2012, his widow and two colleagues wrote a book in which they alleged de la Croix had been involved in a Syrian government plot to kill Jacquier. De la Croix sued for defamation but lost the case.

The same year de la Croix stated that, in Homs, 80,000 Christians were displaced by opposition groups, and that the majority of fighters were from outside Syria. The latter claim was disputed by, among others, an anti-Assad group named Syrian Christians for Democracy, reported The Independent. Interviewed by The Australian in October 2012, she said the rebellion "steadily became a violent Islamist expression against a liberal secular society."

She attempted to prove that Syrian opposition activists fabricated the videos showing victims of the Ghouta chemical attack in Damascus on 21 August 2013. She had no formal training in analysing video evidence or the use of chemical weapons, and compiled a 50-page report. Sergey Lavrov, the Russian foreign minister, cited her analysis when he claimed there were "serious grounds to believe" the Ghouta attack "was a provocation", staged by Syrian rebels. De la Croix was interviewed by the Russian RT station about her analysis. Peter Bouckaert, emergencies director of Human Rights Watch, said that her claims are entirely false, and that HRW found no evidence that the videos were staged. 

She said that in 2013, rebels based near her monastery warned her extremist fighters wanted to abduct her. The rebels helped her to flee. 

She acted as government liaison during the evacuation of Moadamiyah (then under siege) at the end of October 2013. According to rebel spokesman Quasi Zakarya, up to 1,800 women, children and others were freed, and about 300 men were arrested by the government and have been forced to join the Syrian army. According to Raya Jalabi in The Guardian: "Asked whether she considers Hezbollah and Iran – entities which supported the Assad government – to be complicit in the fabric of foreign sectarian forces inside Syria, she said no, as 'Hezbollah isn’t coming in as a religious force, and is not committing crimes of a religious nature.'"

In late 2013, De la Croix toured the United States and visited Europe presenting her version of events in Syria. Organised by the Syria Solidarity Movement, a non-profit organisation based in California, she spoke at venues, mainly churches, on the west and east coasts of the United States.

In November 2013, she withdrew from speaking at the British Stop the War Coalition's annual conference after two participants, Jeremy Scahill and Owen Jones, decided not to speak at the meeting if it meant sharing a platform with de la Croix.

De la Croix said she does not support the Assad government and describes herself as part of the liberal opposition to Assad. She said she supports the "civilian population who is suffering purely at the hands of foreign agents".

References

1952 births
Religious leaders from Beirut
Living people
Carmelite nuns
Lebanese nuns
20th-century Eastern Catholic nuns
21st-century Eastern Catholic nuns